Qeblehi may refer to:
 Qebleh Ei (disambiguation)
 Qeblehi Rural District, in Khuzestan Province

See also
 Qebleh (disambiguation)